The Letaba genet (Genetta letabae) is a genet native to Lesotho, Mozambique, Namibia, South Africa and Eswatini. It is Lesotho and Eswatini's only endemic species of genet.

It was first described in 1906 on the basis of a zoological specimen collected in Knysna, South Africa. It was formerly thought to be a subspecies of the rusty-spotted genet (G. maculata), but has been recognised as a distinct species in 2005.

References

Genets (animals)
Carnivorans of Africa
Mammals described in 1906
Taxa named by Oldfield Thomas